Al-Bab Subdistrict, also called Nahiya Markaz al-Bab, is a subdistrict of al-Bab District in northern Aleppo Governorate, northwestern Syria. Administrative centre is al-Bab. At the 2004 census, the subdistrict had a population of 112,219.

Cities, towns and villages

References 

Al-Bab District
Bab